Quartets is the second album by Boxhead Ensemble, released on October 7, 2003 through Atavistic Records.

Track listing

Personnel 
Boxhead Ensemble
Jessica Billey – violin
Michael Colligan – reeds
Ryan Hembrey – bass guitar
Glenn Kotche – drums
Michael Krassner – musical direction, mixing
Fred Lonberg-Holm – cello
Scott Tuma – guitar

References 

2003 albums
Atavistic Records albums
Boxhead Ensemble albums